Parafimbrios is a genus of snakes belonging to the family Xenodermatidae.

The species of this genus are found in Asia.

Species
Species:

Parafimbrios lao 
Parafimbrios vietnamensis

References

Xenodermidae
Snake genera